Boloria alberta, the Alberta fritillary, is a butterfly of the family Nymphalidae. It is found in the North American Rocky Mountains of British Columbia and Alberta and in northern Montana.

The wingspan is 35–45 mm. The butterfly flies from July to early August. Male Alberta fritillary are dull orange and females are pale orange and grey brown. Their markings are blurred.

The larvae feed on mountain avens (Dryas octopetala). Its habitats include alpine ridges, tundra, and windswept scree slopes.

Subspecies
Boloria alberta alberta (North America)
Boloria alberta kurentzovi (Wyatt, 1961) (Chukotka)

References

External links
Alberta Fritillary, Butterflies and Moths of North America (BAMONA)

Boloria
Butterflies of North America
Butterflies described in 1890